Agave polianthiflora is a relatively small member of the genus Agave, in the subfamily Agavoideae, endemic to northern Mexico.

The succulent is native to the States of Sinaloa, Chihuahua and Sonora.

Because the species is widespread and appears to have a stable population, it is not considered by the IUCN to be threatened.

Description

Leaves are narrow and lanceolate, with multiple white filaments protruding from their edges. Flowers are red and tubular,  in length and narrow, unusual in the genus.

Cultivation
Agave polianthiflora is cultivated as an ornamental plant.  It is mostly easily propagated from seed, as it does not offset as much as other species of Agave. It prefers a shallow, well-drained soil and regular fertilization during vegetation time.

As a container plant grown in cold climates, during the winter it may be kept in a completely dark place.

See also

References

polianthiflora
Endemic flora of Mexico
Flora of Chihuahua (state)
Flora of Sinaloa
Flora of Sonora
Plants described in 1972
Garden plants of North America
Drought-tolerant plants